Schizostachyum glaucifolium, common name Polynesian ohe, is a species of bamboo.

Distribution
This species is native to the South-Central Pacific, from the Marquesas Islands and Society Islands in French Polynesia, as well as in the Southwestern Pacific in the Samoan Islands and Fiji. It is an introduced species in Hawaii.

Habitat
This species prefers tropical or subtropical climates.

Description
This evergreen clump-forming bamboo shows thin walls, long internodes and yellow woody culms with green stripes.

Human culture
These bamboos have been used in French Polynesia by ancient Polynesians for its many uses (baskets, mats, musical instruments, small containers, fishing rods, etc.).

Samoans consider its (known as ʻofe in Samoan) shoots as a sign of misfortune and doom.

Importance 
On the French Polynesian island of Mo'orea, thickets of these bamboo are likely the exclusive breeding habitat of the Moorea reed warbler. Development, overharvesting, and the invasive Miconia have severely depleted these thickets, and the warbler is now critically endangered.

See also
Domesticated plants and animals of Austronesia

References

Further reading
Markle, G. M. et al., eds. 1998. Food and feed crops of the United States, ed. 2.
Ohrnberger, D. 1999. The bamboos of the world.
Parham, J. W. 1972. Plants of the Fiji islands, revised ed.
Wagner, W. L. et al. 1990. Manual of the flowering plants of Hawai'i.

Bambusoideae
Grasses of Oceania